Gert Jan van Woudenberg (born 14 July 1951) is a retired Dutch rower. He competed at the 1976 Summer Olympics in the coxed fours, together with Evert Kroes, Adrie Klem, Martin Baltus and Jos Ruijs, and finished in tenth place. His brother Jan-Willem van Woudenberg took part in the same event at the 1972 Olympics.

References

1951 births
Living people
Dutch male rowers
Olympic rowers of the Netherlands
Rowers at the 1976 Summer Olympics
Sportspeople from Medan